Michaelsberg (Gundelsheim) is a mountain near Gundelsheim, Baden-Württemberg, Germany.

Mountains and hills of Baden-Württemberg